Tantalum arsenide is a compound of tantalum and arsenic with the formula TaAs. It is notable as being the first topological Weyl semimetal that was identified and characterized by ARPES.

Structure 
Tantalum arsenide crystallizes in a body-centered tetragonal cell with lattice parameters a = 3.44 Å and c = 11.65 Å. It belongs to the space group I41md.

Preparation 
TaAs has been prepared by decomposing TaAs2 at 900 °C. A more recent preparation yielded large, single crystals of TaAs by chemical vapor transport with elemental precursors and iodine as the transport agent:
TaI5 (g) + AsI3 (g) ↔ TaAs (s) + 4 I2 (g)

References 

Tantalum compounds
Arsenic compounds